Adriano Duarte Mansur da Silva (born 29 January 1980 in Ponte Nova, Minas Gerais), known as Adriano Duarte, is a Brazilian football defender who plays for Rio Branco.

Career
Previously, he played in his native country and in foreign clubs including French side Nantes, Belgian clubs Mons and Gent. As he did not get any opportunities to play in the team of the French First Division team, he decided to go to Belgium, where he started to play in the team of RAEC Mons. In his own country Duarte was crowned champion in 2001 with his team Atlético Mineiro.

External links

 Profile at Nantes site 
 

1980 births
Living people
Brazilian footballers
Clube Atlético Mineiro players
Club Athletico Paranaense players
FC Nantes players
Duarte Mansur Silva, Adriano
Duarte Mansur Silva, Adriano
Vila Nova Futebol Clube players
Tupi Football Club players
Association football central defenders
Sportspeople from Minas Gerais
Belgian Pro League players
Brazilian expatriate footballers
Brazilian expatriate sportspeople in Belgium
Expatriate footballers in Belgium